Rumbler may refer to:

 Big Daddy (BioShock), a fictional character 
 Rumbler (G.I. Joe), a fictional character 
 Rumbler siren, a type of emergency vehicle siren
 Rumbler Rock, a rock in Antarctica

See also